Scarus zufar, also known as Dhofar parrotfish,  is a species of marine ray-finned fish, a parrotfish, in the family Scaridae. It is found along the central to southern coastal waters of Oman. S. zufar was first identified in 1995.

Description 
This species of parrot fish is blue-green in colour and grows to be 52 centimetres.

Distribution 
It has been found exclusively in the waters of the central and southern coasts of Oman.

Habitat 
Scarus zufar is found in rock and Coral reefs.

Ecology 
S. zufar is described as "fast-growing" and can live up to 9 years.

Threats 
There are no known threats to the Scarus zufar.

References

Further reading
Randall, John E., and John P. Hoover. "Scarus zufar, a new species of parrotfish from southern Oman, with comments on endemism of the area." Copeia (1995): 683-688.
Randall, J.E., 1995. Coastal fishes of Oman. University of Hawaii Press, Honolulu, Hawaii. 439 p.

zufar
Taxa named by John Ernest Randall
Taxa named by John P. Hoover
Fish described in 1995